Epaphius chinensis is a species of ground beetle in the family Carabidae. It is found in China.

References

Trechinae
Beetles described in 1920